Editors used in the PC environment typically operate in a significantly different manner than those in operation on large Mainframe systems. PC editors are almost universally character stream oriented while mainframe editors are typically text line oriented.  Users who need to work on both PCs and mainframes thus need to become productive in two different work styles.

SPFlite is a free file manager and text editor which provides, on Windows PCs, a familiar working environment for those who are used to IBM's mainframe based ISPF. As well as providing the basic ISPF functional compatibility, SPFLite has added extended facilities to enhance editing abilities.

Originally released in 2004; the current version (as of 13 July 2022) is Version 2.6.22194  The program was developed and is maintained by George Deluca.

It is one of several PC versions of the mainframe ISPF system, some commercial and some freeware versions.  See the links for a list.

References

External links
SPFlite website.
Command Technology Corporation website.
List of ISPF-style PC editors.

Windows text editors